Bajjika is an Indo-Aryan language variety spoken in parts of eastern India and Nepal. It is closely related to Maithili (of which it is often considered a dialect).

Territory and speakers 
Bajjika is spoken in the north-western part of Bihar, in a region popularly known as Bajjikanchal. In Bihar, it is mainly spoken in the Samastipur, Sitamarhi, Muzaffarpur, Vaishali, Sheohar districts. It is also spoken in a part of the Darbhanga district adjoining Muzaffarpur and Samastipur districts. A 2013 estimate based on 2001 census data suggests that at the time there were 20 million Bajjika speakers in Bihar (including around 11.46 illiterate adults).

Bajjika is also spoken by a major population in Nepal, where it has 237,947 speakers according to the country's 2001 census.

Relationship to Maithili 

Bajjika has been classified as a dialect of Maithili. Whether Bajjika is classified as a dialect of Maithili depends on whether 'Maithili' is understood as the term for the specific standard Maithili dialect spoken in northern Bihar, or as the name for the whole language as the group of all related dialects together. When the proponents of the Maithili language in Bihar demanded use of Maithili-medium primary education in the early 20th century, the Angika and Bajjika-speaking people did not support them, and instead favoured Hindi-medium education. The discussions around Bajjika's status as a minority language emerged in the 1950s. In the 1960s and the 1970s, when the Maithili speakers demanded a separate Mithila state, the Angika and Bajjika speakers made counter-demands for recognition of their languages.

Maithili proponents believe that the Government of Bihar and the pro-Hindi Bihar Rashtrabhasha Parishad promoted Angika and Bajjika as distinct languages to weaken the Maithili language movement.  People from mainly Maithil Brahmins and Karan Kayasthas castes supported the Maithili movement in the days when it was to be subsumed as a dialect of Hindi / Bengali, hence anti-Maithili factions branded the Maithili Language as a Brahminical language while inciting various other castes in the Mithila region to project Angika and Bajjika as their mother tongues, attempting to break away from the Maithili-based regional identity.

Films in Bajjika 

Lakshmi Elthin Hammar Angna (2009) was the first formal feature film in Bajjika. Sajan Aiha Doli le ke came after that.

See also
Bihari languages
Tirhut

References

Bibliography

Further reading 

Kashyap, Abhishek Kumar. 2014. The Bajjika language and speech community. International Journal of the Sociology of Language 227: 209–224.
Kashyap, Abhishek Kumar. 2012. The pragmatic principles of agreement in Bajjika verb. Journal of Pragmatics 44: 1668–1687.

External links 
 http://www.bajjika.in  Official Website of Bajjika Vikash Manch

Eastern Indo-Aryan languages
Languages of Bihar
Languages of Nepal
Languages of Madhesh Province